Betsy Reed (born 1968) is an American journalist and editor. From January 2015, she was the editor-in-chief of The Intercept. In July 2022, she was named the editor-in-chief of Guardian US, succeeding John Mulholland, and will assume her new position in the Fall.

Reed earned a bachelor's degree in History and Literature from Harvard University in 1990. She worked for sixteen years as editor at the weekly magazine The Nation, starting as senior editor in 1998, and promoted to executive editor in 2006. She left The Nation in late 2014 in order to join The Intercept as its editor-in-chief.

She has also edited several books of investigative journalism, including Blackwater and Dirty Wars by Jeremy Scahill, and the essay collection Going Rouge: Sarah Palin, An American Nightmare.

In October 2020, Reed became embroiled in a public dispute with Glenn Greenwald, co-founding editor of The Intercept. Greenwald resigned in protest, saying that the publication refused to publish an article he wrote on Democratic U.S. presidential candidate Joe Biden unless he removed sections critical of Biden. Reed disputed Greenwald's charge, and said she had asked Greenwald to substantiate his statements as part of the normal editing process but that Greenwald had refused. The following week, Laura Poitras, who, like Greenwald, co-founded The Intercept, said she had been fired in 2016 "without cause" from First Look Media, the parent company of The Intercept, for criticizing The Intercepts handling of whistleblower Reality Winner. In an open letter dated January 14, 2021, Poitras singled out Reed and First Look Media's CEO Michael Bloom for her firing. First Look responded that it had not renewed Poitras's employment contract because she had not been very active with the company in recent years, and Reed called Poitras' claims "baseless and frankly ridiculous".

References 

1968 births
Living people
American magazine editors
Women magazine editors
American online journalists
The Nation (U.S. magazine) people
Loomis Chaffee School alumni
Harvard University alumni